Argo is an extinct town in Burt County, Nebraska, United States.

History
A post office was established at Argo in 1878, and remained in operation until it was discontinued in 1904. The community was named after the mythological ship Argo.

References

Geography of Burt County, Nebraska